The 2000 du Maurier Open was a tennis tournament played on outdoor hard courts. It was the 111th edition of the event known that year as the du Maurier Open, and was part of the Tennis Masters Series of the 2000 ATP Tour, and of the Tier I Series of the 2000 WTA Tour. The men's event took place at the National Tennis Centre in Toronto, Ontario, Canada, from July 31 through August 6, 2000, and the women's event at the du Maurier Stadium in Montreal, Quebec, Canada, from August 14 through August 20, 2000.

The men's field featured World No. 1, Australian Open champion, Wimbledon semifinalist Andre Agassi, ATP No. 2 and seven-time Wimbledon champion and Miami winner Pete Sampras, and French Open runner-up, Rome Masters, Auckland and Båstad titlist Magnus Norman. Also competing were French Open and Hamburg Masters champion Gustavo Kuerten, Australian Open finalist Yevgeny Kafelnikov, Thomas Enqvist, Lleyton Hewitt and Marat Safin.

The women's draw was led by World No. 1, Australian Open runner-up, French Open doubles champion and Canada defending champion Martina Hingis, WTA No. 2, Australian Open champion and Wimbledon finalist Lindsay Davenport, and French Open runner-up and Berlin titlist Conchita Martínez. Also lined up were Wimbledon doubles champion Serena Williams, Paris winner Nathalie Tauziat, Anke Huber, Arantxa Sánchez Vicario and Sandrine Testud.

Finals

Men's singles

 Marat Safin defeated  Harel Levy, 6–2, 6–3
It was Marat Safin's 3rd title of the year, and his 4th overall. It was his 1st career Masters title.

Women's singles

 Martina Hingis defeated  Serena Williams, 0–6, 6–3, 3–0 retired
It was Martina Hingis' 5th title of the year, and her 31st overall. It was her 3rd Tier I title of the year, her 12th overall, and her 2nd win at the event.

Men's doubles

 Sébastien Lareau /  Daniel Nestor defeated  Joshua Eagle /  Andrew Florent, 6–3, 7–6(7–3)

Women's doubles

 Martina Hingis /  Nathalie Tauziat defeated  Julie Halard-Decugis /  Ai Sugiyama, 6–3, 3–6, 6–4

References

External links
Official website
Men's Singles draw
Men's Doubles draw
Women's Singles draw
Women's Doubles draw

 
Du Maurier Open
Du Maurier Open
du Maurier Open
du Maurier Open
Canadian Open (tennis)